Bandits of the West is a 1953 American Western film directed by Harry Keller and starring Allan Lane, Cathy Downs and Eddy Waller.

The film's sets were designed by the art director James W. Sullivan.

Plot

Cast
 Allan Lane as Marshal Rocky Lane 
 Black Jack as Rocky's Horse 
 Eddy Waller as Nugget Clark 
 Cathy Downs as Joanne Collier 
 Roy Barcroft as Bud Galloway  
 Trevor Bardette as Jeff Chadwick  
 Ray Montgomery as Steve Edrington  
 Byron Foulger as Eric Strikler  
 Harry Harvey as Judge Walters  
 Robert Bice as Henchman Dutch 
 Lane Bradford as Henchman  
 Roy Bucko as Townsman  
 Edward Clark as John Anders  
 Wade Crosby as Big Jim Foley  
 Art Dillard as Henchman Kirby  
 Kenneth MacDonald as Nugget's Assistant  
 Jack Montgomery as Townsman  
 Jack Perrin as Townsman Ned  
 Lee Phelps as Rancher  
 Jack Tornek as Townsman

References

Bibliography
 Bernard A. Drew. Motion Picture Series and Sequels: A Reference Guide. Routledge, 2013.

External links
 

1953 films
1953 Western (genre) films
American Western (genre) films
Films directed by Harry Keller
Republic Pictures films
American black-and-white films
1950s English-language films
1950s American films